The 2012–13 Women's National League was the second season of the Women's National League. This season was again sponsored by Bus Éireann. The six founding members of the league – Peamount United, Castlebar Celtic, Cork Women's F.C., Raheny United, Shamrock Rovers and Wexford Youths – were joined for the second season by DLR Waves. Raheny United won their first of two WNL titles. They also complete a league and cup double after already winning the 2012 FAI Women's Cup. Peamount United won the 2013 WNL Cup with a 6–3 win over Castlebar Celtic. Sara Lawlor of Peamount United was the top league goalscorer with 28 goals. She also won a second consecutive Player of the Season award.

Final table

Top goalscorers

WNL Awards
Senior Player of the Year
 Sara Lawlor (Peamount United)
Young Player of the Year
 Rianna Jarrett (Wexford Youths)
Top Goalscorer Award
 Sara Lawlor (Peamount United)
Service to Women's Football Award 
 Jeremy Dee (Castlebar Celtic)
Team of the Season

References

Women's National League (Ireland) seasons
Ireland
Women
Women
1